The Thomas Commercial Historic District is a national historic district located at Thomas, Tucker County, West Virginia. It encompasses 48 contributing buildings and two contributing structures. They include the business and commercial core of Thomas. Most of the buildings in the district date from the late-19th and early-20th century in popular architectural styles, such as Italianate, Renaissance Revival, and Gothic Revival.  They are primarily two and three story masonry buildings with storefronts on the first floor and housing above.  Notable buildings include the Frank Calobrese Building (1902), Duncan Funeral Home Building (1899), Miners and Merchant Bank (1902), City Hall (1927), and Thomas Central Power Plant Dam (1911).  Also located in the district is the separately listed Cottrill Opera House (1902).

It was listed on the National Register of Historic Places in 1998.

Gallery

References

National Register of Historic Places in Tucker County, West Virginia
Historic districts in Tucker County, West Virginia
Gothic Revival architecture in West Virginia
Renaissance Revival architecture in West Virginia
Italianate architecture in West Virginia
Buildings and structures in Taylor County, West Virginia
Historic districts on the National Register of Historic Places in West Virginia